State Route 236 (SR 236), known locally as Tiny Town Road, is an east–west secondary state highway located entirely in Montgomery County in Middle Tennessee.

Route description 
SR 236 connects US 41A (Fort Campbell Boulevard) with SR 48 (Trenton Road) on the north side of Clarksville.

The route also has an intersection with Pembroke Road, which connects SR 236 with Kentucky Route 115 at the state line.

SR 236 also passes by the Clarksville-Montgomery County Regional Airport near its western end.

Major intersections

References 

236
236